Torben Rehfeldt (born 7 August 1993) is a German professional footballer who plays as centre-back for Regionalliga Nord club Weiche Flensburg.

Career
After joining Werder Bremen in July 2012, Rehfeldt initially played for the club's U-21 team. In the 2014–15 season he was promoted to the reserves playing in the 3. Liga.

In May 2017, he signed a two-year contract with 3. Liga rivals VfR Aalen.

Having left SV Elversberg upon the expiration of his contract after the 2020–21 season, Rehfeldt moved to Regionalliga Nord club SC Weiche Flensburg 08 in July 2021. He signed a two-year contract.

References

External links
 

1993 births
Living people
German footballers
Association football defenders
Holstein Kiel players
SV Werder Bremen II players
SV Werder Bremen players
VfR Aalen players
SV Elversberg players
SC Weiche Flensburg 08 players
3. Liga players
Regionalliga players